Ramnagar is a village in the southern state of Karnataka, India. It is situated in Joida Taluk of Uttara Kannada. Ramnagar is the junction where roads coming from Dharwad, Belagavi and Anmod (Goa) meet. Ramnagar is at the distance of four Kilometre from Londa. Ramnagar is basically rehabilitation area for the people displaced by Hydro electric projects (Dams) built across river Kali in the state of Karnataka.Few shops and road side eateries are there in Ramnagar. It has a Post office, branch of nationalised bank, Police station and Industrial training Institute(I.T.I). There is also NWKRTC bus stand at Ramnagar. Most of the NWKRTC,KSRTC,KKRTC(formerly NEKRTC) buses coming from different places of Karnataka state going towards Goa state have a stop here.

Demographics

2011

References

Villages in Uttara Kannada district